Museum "Wooden Sculpture" or Wooden Sculpture Museum was created in 2008 by artist Igor Fartushnyi. The museum is located in village Yabluniv, Kosiv district, Ivano-Frankivsk region, Ukraine. The museum exhibition consists of master Igor's works.

Museum Exhibition 
Museum exhibition includes more than 100 sculptures made by the artist during his life. Even more sculptures are under the creation process. 
They are of the different themes: real and fantastic birds, animals, people. The idea is not to create something totally new from the wood, but help the nature to show and express its own art.

The exhibition can be visited almost at any time, since the museum is located in the yard of the artist's home. The museum is a part of Precarpathian Museum Ring.

About the master 
Igor Fartushnyi was born on January 2, 1947, in village Serafymtsi, Horodenka Raion, Ivano-Frankivsk region, Ukraine in the family of teachers.

Sources 
Precarpathian Museum Ring

Art museums and galleries in Ukraine
Sculpture galleries in Ukraine
Museums in Ivano-Frankivsk Oblast
Wooden sculptures in Ukraine